Marie-Laure Brunet (born 20 November 1988 in Lannemezan, Hautes-Pyrénées) is a retired French biathlete and Olympic athlete who won a bronze medal in the women's pursuit at the 2010 Winter Olympic Games of Vancouver.

Brunet made her Biathlon World Cup debut in March 2007 at Kontiolahti, shortly after winning a gold medal in the pursuit event at the Youth World Championships. During her career she developed a reputation as one of the most accurate shooters on the biathlon circuit. Brunet announced her retirement in June 2014 after suffering health problems, including collapsing during the relay at the 2014 Olympics.

Results

Olympics
2 medals (1 silver, 1 bronze)

*The mixed relay was added as an event in 2014.

World Championships
9 medals (1 gold, 5 silver, 3 bronze)

*During Olympic seasons competitions are only held for those events not included in the Olympic program.

World Cup
Relay victories
2 victories

References

External links

1988 births
Living people
French female biathletes
Biathletes at the 2010 Winter Olympics
Biathletes at the 2014 Winter Olympics
Olympic biathletes of France
Medalists at the 2010 Winter Olympics
Olympic medalists in biathlon
Olympic bronze medalists for France
Olympic silver medalists for France
Biathlon World Championships medalists
Université Savoie-Mont Blanc alumni
Officers of the Ordre national du Mérite
21st-century French women